Mingrelian may refer to:
the Mingrelians
the Mingrelian language